Bayrash (Bayraş) is a rural locality (a village) in Karansky Selsoviet, Buzdyaksky District, Bashkortostan, Russia. The population was 106 as of 2010. There are 3 streets.

Geography 
Bayrash is located 17 km north of Buzdyak (the district's administrative centre) by road. Karan is the nearest rural locality.

References 

Rural localities in Buzdyaksky District